Sev Kardeşim is a 1972 Turkish comedy film directed by Ertem Eğilmez.

Cast 
 Hülya Koçyiğit - Alev Güler
 Tarık Akan - Ferit Çaliskan
 Münir Özkul - Mesut Güler
 Adile Naşit - Mesude
  - Maksut Güler
 Halit Akçatepe - Ali
  - Alev'in Dayisi
 Hulusi Kentmen - Cemal Çaliskan
  - Ferit'in Annesi
 Zeki Alasya - Avukat

References

External links 

1972 comedy films
1972 films
Turkish comedy films